is a JR West railway station located in Nagato, Yamaguchi Prefecture, Japan.

Lines
Hatabu Station is served by the San'in Main Line.

Layout 
The station consists of two tracks using side platforms at surface level. The station is unattended.

External links 

 Official station website (in Japanese)

Railway stations in Japan opened in 1929
Railway stations in Yamaguchi Prefecture
Sanin Main Line
Stations of West Japan Railway Company